The Soldiers of Heaven or Jund As-Samāʾ, were an armed Iraqi Shi'a messianic sect  who suffered major losses, and their leader Dia Abdul Zahra Kadim killed, in the late January 2007 Battle of Najaf,
 as they allegedly attempted to start a "messianic insurrection" against the holy city of Najaf and the grand ayatollahs living there during the holy day of Ashura.

The sect were settled (prior to the battle), with their families at a "camp in Zarga, north of Najaf", where "the main part" of the fighting took place (despite the battle being called the Battle of Najaf).

The group has been described as an apocalyptic Muslim cult, "the most radical" members of another group --  the "Supporters of the Imam Mahdi" -- led by Ahmad al-Hassan;  and to believe that spreading chaos would hasten the return of the 12th Imam/Mahdi, who will then rule the world, destroying tyranny and falsehood and bringing peace and justice before the Day of Judgement.

While some report the group was annihilated at the battle, other sources report a large number captured and continued activity by the "soldiers".

Leadership
Dia Abdul-Zahra, also known as Abu Kamar, claimed to be the Mahdi, a messiah-like figure in Islam. Iraqi officials have claimed that Ahmed al-Hassan, another leader in the group involved in the fighting against American and Iraqi forces, and was also a participant in the fighting in Najaf, is actually a Sunni pretending to be a Shiite, with an Iraqi general from the Babil Governorate telling the New York Times in an interview, "He is a Wahhabi he is from a Sunni town". Two rival Shiite clerics also made these claims regarding Hassan denying he was a Shiite, however other Shiite clerics have stated Hassan studied at a Shiite seminary in Najaf but later broke off from it. Iraqi MP Jalal al-Din Ali al-Saghir said regarding Hassan "I am 100 percent sure that the group's deputy was a security officer with the old regime."

Background

Beliefs
According to reports, The Soldiers of Heaven are/were:
 "profoundly" Iraqi nationalist and anti-Iranian;
 hostile to the Shia clerical hierarchy and "particularly to Ayatollah Sistani, (a native of Iran, though he has lived in Najaf since 1952);
 believe their former leader Dia Abdul Zahra Kadim was the Mahdi and he was the reincarnation of Imam Ali ibn Abu Talib;
 believe spreading chaos will hasten the return of the Hidden Imam.

Explanations and supporters

Although the city and region are central to Shia history and major pilgrimage sites, Shi'i "dogma has relatively shallow roots in the region", because conversion by tribes to Shi'ism in the area goes back "no further than the nineteenth century". Moreover, the minority Shaykhia school of Shi'ism, which "claims to have a direct relationship" with the Hidden Iman and denies the importance of the clerical hierarchy, has been developing.

Speculations have hinted that Iran may be behind finances of the group however this has never been confirmed. Some have also theorized the group may be affiliated with al-Qaeda, several Iraqi officials have also adopted this narrative regarding the group however this has also never been confirmed, this view has also been questioned given the sectarian difference between the two. The Iraqi government has also claimed that the group has been infiltrated by Baathists and loyalists to Saddam Hussein, including ex-intelligence officers.

Membership
The members of the group, which numbered around 1,000, appeared to be mostly poor Shi'a farmers from an agricultural area 19 kilometres northeast of Najaf, but they also seemed to have been heavily armed. In spite of their poverty, the group appeared to have amassed a great deal of wealth. Some (including Iraqi officials) have also claimed that the group included former Iraqi personnel affiliated with Saddam Hussein's government and the (formerly) ruling Baath Party.  According to Iraqi officials according to the Associated Press, "Sunni extremists and Saddam Hussein loyalists were helping the cult" attempt to attack pilgrims and clerics.

Activities
On January 28, 2007, the group apparently fought a bizarre battle with Iraqi and U.S. forces near Najaf where it is alleged about 200–300 of their members were killed, including its leader, and 300–400 were captured. Asaad Abu Gilel, the governor of Najaf has claimed that members of the group, including women and children, planned to disguise themselves as pilgrims and kill leading Shi'a clerics during the Ashoura holiday.

Significant questions remain regarding the group and the combat effectiveness it displayed, including shooting down an American AH-64 Apache helicopter gunship. Virtually all information about the group and the battle has come from Iraqi officials, who have released incomplete and sometimes contradictory accounts. Iraqi officials, including Najaf deputy governor Abdel Hussein Attan, had claimed that the group had links with al-Qaeda, but given that Sunni jihadists are fiercely anti-Shia, this seemed unlikely.

After the battle, Iraqi police rounded up hundreds of sect members and put them on trial. On September 2, 2007, the criminal court passed judgement on 458 accused. Ten leaders of the Soldiers of Heaven were sentenced to death, 54 members were released, and the rest were sentenced to jail terms ranging from 15 years to life, Najaf police chief Brigadier General Abdel Karim Mustapha said.

On January 18, 2008 the Soldiers of Heaven were involved in fighting in Basra and Nassiriya.

See also
List of extinct Shia sects

References

Books

Arab militant groups
Factions in the Iraq War
Rebel groups in Iraq
Iraqi insurgency (2003–2011)
Islam in Iraq
Shia Islamic branches
Apocalyptic groups
Millenarianism
Shia Islamist groups
Mahdism
Cults